was a Japanese football player. He played for the Japanese national team.

National team career
In May 1925, when Miyake was a Kansai University student, he was selected to play on the Japanese national team for the 1925 Far Eastern Championship Games in Manila. At this competition, on May 17, he debuted against the Philippines. On May 20, he also played against the Republic of China. But Japan lost in both matches (0-4, v Philippines and 0-2, v Republic of China).

After retirement
After graduating from Kansai University, Miyake joined Asahi Shimbun in 1926.

On November 30, 1984, Miyake died of pneumonia at the age of 83.

National team statistics

References

External links
 
 Japan National Football Team Database

Year of birth missing
1984 deaths
Kansai University alumni
Japanese footballers
Japan international footballers
Association football forwards